Situated on the bank of Kaligandaki river, Khadgakot (Nepali: खड्गकोट) is a town and Village Development Committee (Nepali: गाउँ विकास समिति, Gaun Vikas Samiti), in Gulmi District in the Lumbini Zone of central Nepal. At the time of the 1991 Nepal census it had a population of 4297 persons living in 808 individual households.

References

This is the second largest VDC of the gulmi district.

External links
UN map of the Village Development Committees/Municipalities of Gulmi District

Populated places in Gulmi District